Tartu Rose is an apple cultivar from Estonia.

At first it was thought to be an original cultivar and therefore named with its own name. Later, a strong similarity to the American 'Wealthy' cultivar was discovered.

References

External links

Apple cultivars
Agriculture in Estonia
Tartu